Giovanni Battista Vergerio (died 1548) was a Roman Catholic prelate who served as Bishop of Pula (1497–1531).

Biography
On 5 January 1532, Giovanni Battista Vergerio was appointed by Pope Clement VII as Bishop of Pula. He served as Bishop of Pula until his death in 1548.

While bishop, he was the principal consecrator of Pietro Paolo Vergerio, Bishop of Modruš.

References

External links and additional sources
 (for Chronology of Bishops) 
 (for Chronology of Bishops) 

16th-century Roman Catholic bishops in Croatia
1548 deaths
Bishops appointed by Pope Clement VII